A supervolcano is a volcano that has had an eruption with a Volcanic Explosivity Index (VEI) of 8, the largest recorded value on the index. This means the volume of deposits for such an eruption is greater than 1,000 cubic kilometers (240 cubic miles).

Supervolcanoes occur when magma in the mantle rises into the crust but is unable to break through it. Pressure builds in a large and growing magma pool until the crust is unable to contain the pressure and ruptures. This can occur at hotspots (for example, Yellowstone Caldera) or at subduction zones (for example, Toba).

Large-volume supervolcanic eruptions are also often associated with large igneous provinces, which can cover huge areas with lava and volcanic ash. These can cause long-lasting climate change (such as the triggering of a small ice age) and threaten species with extinction. The Oruanui eruption of New Zealand's Taupō Volcano (about 26,500 years ago) was the world's most recent VEI-8 eruption.

Terminology 
The term "supervolcano" was first used in a volcanic context in 1949.

Its origins lie in an early 20th-century scientific debate about the geological history and features of the Three Sisters volcanic region of Oregon in the United States. In 1925, Edwin T. Hodge suggested that a very large volcano, which he named Mount Multnomah, had existed in that region. He believed that several peaks in the Three Sisters area were remnants of Mount Multnomah after it had been largely destroyed by violent volcanic explosions, similarly to Mount Mazama. In his 1948 book The Ancient Volcanoes of Oregon, volcanologist Howel Williams ignored the possible existence of Mount Multnomah, but in 1949 another volcanologist, F. M. Byers Jr., reviewed the book, and in the review, Byers refers to Mount Multnomah as a supervolcano.

More than fifty years after Byers' review was published, the term supervolcano was popularised by the BBC popular science television program Horizon in 2000, referring to eruptions that produce extremely large amounts of ejecta.

The term megacaldera is sometimes used for caldera supervolcanoes, such as the Blake River Megacaldera Complex in the Abitibi greenstone belt of Ontario and Quebec, Canada.

Eruptions that rate VEI 8 are termed "super eruptions". Though there is no well-defined minimum explosive size for a "supervolcano", there are at least two types of volcanic eruptions that have been identified as supervolcanoes: large igneous provinces and massive eruptions.

Large igneous provinces 

Large igneous provinces, such as Iceland, the Siberian Traps, Deccan Traps, and the Ontong Java Plateau, are extensive regions of basalts on a continental scale resulting from flood basalt eruptions. When created, these regions often occupy several thousand square kilometres and have volumes on the order of millions of cubic kilometers. In most cases, the lavas are normally laid down over several million years. They release large amounts of gases.

The Réunion hotspot produced the Deccan Traps about 66 million years ago, coincident with the Cretaceous–Paleogene extinction event. The scientific consensus is that a meteor impact was the cause of the extinction event, but the volcanic activity may have caused environmental stresses on extant species up to the Cretaceous–Paleogene boundary. Additionally, the largest flood basalt event (the Siberian Traps) occurred around 250 million years ago and was coincident with the largest mass extinction in history, the Permian–Triassic extinction event, although it is unknown whether it was solely responsible for the extinction event.

Such outpourings are not explosive, though lava fountains may occur. Many volcanologists consider Iceland to be a large igneous province that is currently being formed. An estimated  of basaltic lava was poured out during the eruption (VEI 4).

Massive explosive eruptions 

Volcanic eruptions are classified using the Volcanic explosivity index, or VEI. It is a logarithmic scale, which means that an increase of one in VEI number is equivalent to a tenfold increase in volume of erupted material. VEI 7 or VEI 8 eruptions are so powerful that they often form circular calderas rather than cones because the downward withdrawal of magma causes the overlying rock mass to collapse into the empty magma chamber beneath it.

Known super eruptions 
Based on incomplete statistics, at least 60 VEI 8 eruptions have been identified. Below is a list of well-known super-eruptions.

Media portrayal 

 Nova featured an episode "Mystery of the Megavolcano" in September 2006 examining such eruptions in the last 100,000 years.
 Supervolcano is the title of a British-Canadian television disaster film, first released in 2005. It tells a fictional story of a supereruption at Yellowstone.

Gallery

See also

Notes

References

Further reading

External links 
 Overview and Transcript of the original BBC program
 Yellowstone Supervolcano and Map of Supervolcanoes Around The World
 USGS Fact Sheet – Steam Explosions, Earthquakes, and Volcanic Eruptions – What's in Yellowstone's Future?
 Scientific American's The Secrets of Supervolcanoes
 Supervolcano eruption mystery solved, BBC Science, 6 January 2014

Volcanology
Geological hazards
 
Volcanic landforms
Doomsday scenarios
Future problems
Lists of volcanic eruptions